Prolagus is an extinct genus of pika within the order Lagomorpha. Over 20 species of Prolagus have been named, beginning in the Early Miocene in Europe 20 million years ago, where it ranged widely for most of the epoch; by the end of the Middle Pleistocene, it was confined to a single species, the Sardinian pika (P. sardus), on the Mediterranean islands of Corsica, Sardinia, and surrounding islands, where it survived into historical times. In Africa and Asia, the genus is known from the Miocene and Pliocene. The scientific name may mean "before hares" or "primitive hares" (pro- meaning "before" and lagos meaning "hare").

Taxonomy 
Prolagus was first named by Auguste Pomel in 1853. Prolagus has been considered by most taxonomists to be a member of the pika family Ochotonidae, but distinct from living pikas, which all belong to the genus Ochotona. Erbaleva in 1988 suggested it represented the only member of the monotypic family Prolagidae due to its distinct dental formula; this proposal was considered invalid by Nieves López Martínez, due to the fact that many mammal families have lineages with distinct dental formulae. However, many authorities such as the IUCN Red List and American Society of Mammalogists accept Prolagidae as valid.

Description 
Prolagus is distinguished by a continuously growing dentition, a lack of a lower third molar, a trilobed second lower molar and unusually shaped premolars, with additional cusps in the lower third premolar. In comparison to modern pikas of the genus Ochotona, they have one less dorsal vertebra in the spinal column. Most species of Prolagus probably weighed around 500 g, similar to a living pika. A specimen with preserved soft-tissue is known from late Miocene aged deposits from Andance in France, which shows that its overall proportions, shape of the ears and lack of tail are similar to living Ochotona.

Species 
Over 20 species of Prolagus have been named.

Evolutionary history and ecology 
Prolagus likely evolved from the Oligocene-earliest Miocene genus Piezodus. The distribution of Prolagus between 20-8 million years ago extends from the Iberian Peninsula in the west to Anatolia in the east, extending as far north as central Germany, though it was absent from the Italian Peninsula. Early Prolagus species are thought to have inhabited subtropical swamp and wetland environments, with a similar ecology to the living marsh rabbit (Sylvilagus palustris). In many European Miocene localities remains of Prolagus are extraordinarily abundant, and Prolagus species probably played a key role as prey for many predators. During the late Miocene, Prolagus dispersed into North Africa due to the connection between Africa and Europe as a result of the Messinian salinity crisis. The range of Prolagus shifted southwards and substantially contracted outside of North Africa during the Pliocene, due to climatic cooling and increasing aridity, though the genus reached its highest species richness at 9 species due to habitat fragmentation leading to speciation. Prolagus first arrived in Corsica, Sardinia, and other Mediterranean islands at the early-late Pliocene boundary, likely due to an emergent land connection. The earliest remains of Prolagus on the islands are represented by the species P. figaro, ancestral to P. sardus. Among the last continental species of Prolagus is P. calpensis from the Early-Middle Pleistocene of the Iberian Peninsula. By the end of the Pleistocene, Prolagus was confined to Corsica, Sardinia and surrounding islands. The cause of the extinction of the mainland Prolagus species is not clear, but has been suggested to be due to increased predation pressure.

Notes

References

Additional references of the Paleobiology Database

Pikas
Prehistoric lagomorphs
Prehistoric placental genera
Miocene genus first appearances
Holocene extinctions
Fossil taxa described in 1853